Si Sawat is a district (amphoe) in Kanchanaburi province, western Thailand.

Geography 
Neighboring districts are (from the north clockwise) Ban Rai of Uthai Thani province, Dan Chang of Suphanburi province, Nong Prue, Bo Phloi, Kanchanaburi, Sai Yok and Thong Pha Phum of Kanchanburi Province.

The district is dominated by the Si Nakharin Reservoir, which is part of Khuean Srinagarindra National Park. The 140-metre-high Si Nakharin Dam was finished in 1980 and creates a 419 km2 impoundment of the Kwae Yai River. The dam has received criticism for being built on the Si Sawat fault line.

To the south of the district is Erawan National Park, best known for its Erawan Waterfall.

Administration
The district is divided into six sub-districts (tambons), which are further subdivided into 33 villages (mubans). The township (thesaban tambon) Erawan  covers parts of tambon Tha Kradan. There are a further six tambon administrative organizations (TAO).

References

External links

amphoe.com

Si Sawat